This is a list of Albanian football transfers for the 2013 summer transfer window by club. Only transfers of clubs in the Albanian Superliga will be included.

The summer transfer window will open on 1 June 2013, although a few transfers may take place prior to that date. The window will close at midnight on 31 August 2013. Players without a club may join one at any time, either during or in between transfer windows.

Superliga

Besa Kavajë 

In:

Out:

Bylis Ballsh 

In:

Out:

Flamurtari Vlorë 

In:

Out:

Kastrioti 

In:

Out:

Kukësi 

In:

Out:

Laçi 

In:

Out:

Lushnja 

In:

Out:

Partizani Tirana 

In:

Out:

Skënderbeu Korçë 

In:

Out:

Teuta Durrës 

In:

Out:

Tirana 

In:

Out:

Vllaznia Shkodër 

In:

Out:

References

External links

Football transfers summer 2013
Football transfers summer
2013